William J. Spencer (1867–1933) was an American labor leader who was secretary-treasurer of the Building Trades Department of the American Federation of Labor from its founding nearly continuously until his death in 1933.

Spencer was born in Hamilton, Ontario, in 1867. He became a plumber and emigrated to Buffalo, New York, in 1894, where he joined Local 36 of the Journeymen Plumbers.

Spencer was elected secretary-treasurer of the international Plumbers' union in 1897. In 1900, he was appointed "general organizer" of the union.

In 1903, Spencer was elected secretary-treasurer of the Structural Building Trades Alliance (SBTA).  He served until 1908, when the SBTA affiliated with the American Federation of Labor (AFL) and became the Building Trades Department (BTD). He was elected secretary-treasurer of the BTD, and served until 1924.  He was elected to the same office again in 1927, and served until his death in 1933.

In 1904, Spencer was elected eighth vice-president of the AFL.  He served one year.

Spencer lived in Dayton, Ohio, from 1903 to 1912, after which he lived in Washington, D.C.

References 
 "Glossary." In The Samuel Gompers Papers, Vol. 6: The American Federation of Labor and the Rise of Progressivism, 1902-6. Stuart J Kaufman, Peter J. Albert, and Grace Palladino, eds. Urbana, Ill.: University of Illinois Press, 1997. 
 Palladino, Grace. Skilled Hands, Strong Spirits. Ithaca, N.Y.:  Cornell University Press, 2005. 

1867 births
1933 deaths
American Federation of Labor people
American trade union leaders
Trade unionists from New York (state)
American plumbers
Activists from Buffalo, New York
People from Dayton, Ohio
People from Hamilton, Ontario
People from Washington, D.C.
Trade unionists from Ohio
Canadian emigrants to the United States